Eirado is a freguesia in Aguiar da Beira Municipality, Guarda District, Portugal. The population in 2011 was 230, in an area of 9.24 km2.

Demography

References 

Freguesias of Aguiar da Beira